The European Roller Hockey Juvenile Championship is an annual roller hockey competition for the under-17 national teams of Europe organised by World Skate Europe - Rink Hockey.

Spain are the current champions, after beating Portugal 5-4 in the final of the 2018 tournament, held in Correggio, Italy.

Results

Tournaments

Medal table

External links
Federação de Patinagem de Portugal
Real Federation Espanola de Patinaje
Federazione Intaliana Hockey e Pattinaggio
World Skate Europe - all competitions

European Roller Hockey Juvenile Championship